Hadid is a moshav in central Israel.

Hadid, Hadeed  or Al-Hadid may refer to:
Hadid, Iran, a village in Khuzestan Province, Iran
Gulshan-e-Hadeed,  is a neighborhood of Karachi, Pakistan, meaning Garden of Iron.
Al-Hadid, the 57th sura of the Qur'an
Hadid (personal name)
Hadeed Plateau, Somalia

See also
Hadidi (disambiguation)
Haditha (disambiguation)